Jan Rulewski (born April 18, 1944 in Bydgoszcz, Poland) is a Polish politician, activist of Solidarity; a Member of the Polish Sejm (1991-2001) and a Senator (since 2007).

He was in charge of the Bydgoszcz region of Solidarity (1980-1981 and from 1989). He was assaulted by police during the Bydgoszcz events in 1981 and interned during the martial law in Poland.

He was a Member of the Sejm of the Republic of Poland from 1991 to 2001.

On October 21, 2007, Jan Rulewski (Civic Platform - PO) won in the Polish Senate election in Bydgoszcz district with 142,054 votes (33.71%). With Zbigniew Pawłowicz (PO also) was elected to the Senate of the Republic of Poland from Bydgoszcz district. He took office on November 6.

On August 28, 2006, Rulewski was awarded the Commander's Cross of the Order of Polonia Restituta by President Lech Kaczynski.

External links
  JanRulewski.pl

1944 births
Living people
Politicians from Bydgoszcz
Solidarity (Polish trade union) activists
Commanders of the Order of Polonia Restituta
Polish dissidents
Members of the Polish Sejm 1991–1993
Members of the Polish Sejm 1993–1997
Members of the Polish Sejm 1997–2001
Members of the Senate of Poland 2007–2011